Rajiv Ranjan Singh alias Lalan Singh (born 24 January 1955) is an Indian politician and Member of Parliament representing Munger in the 17th Lok Sabha from Janata Dal (United). He is National party president of JDU (Janta Dal United). He was  also the former JD(U) Bihar unit President.

He was nominated as a member of the Bihar Legislative Council in June 2014 after his defeat in the May 2014 Lok Sabha elections. He was a member of the 15th Lok Sabha of India and represented Munger Lok Sabha constituency of Bihar. He also represented Begusarai constituency in the 14th Lok Sabha of India.

Personal life
Singh was born in Patna on 24 January 1955 to Jwala Prasad Singh and Kaushalya Devi in a Bhumihar family. He graduated with a Bachelor of Arts (Honors) degree from T.N.B. College, Bhagalpur University. Singh was a General Secretary of College Students Union and in 1974, had participated in the movements led by Jayaprakash Narayan.

Singh is married to Renu Devi and they have a daughter together.

Political background

Lalan Singh represented the Munger constituency of Bihar and was the President of Bihar JDU when he rebelled against CM Nitish Kumar in 2010 and later continued to be an unattached member of JD(U). The party moved in Lok Sabha to demand his disqualification but the move was aborted post his rapprochement with Nitish Kumar in 2013. He was given a ticket to contest the Munger Lok Sabha seat but was defeated by Veena Devi of LJP by nearly 1 lakh votes.

He was nominated to the Bihar Legislative Council under the Governor's quota and made the Minister for Road Construction Department in the Jitan Ram Manjhi cabinet in June 2014. His induction and elevation despite the electoral loss sparked a rebellion in JDU led by Gyanendra Singh Gyanu who later defected to BJP with a group of 12 MLAs. He was sacked from the cabinet by Jitan Ram Manjhi as a minister along with Prashant Kumar Shahi in February 2015. When Nitish Kumar became Chief Minister, he was again inducted as a Minister in the Mahagathbandhan Government.

References

External links
 Home Page on the Parliament of India's Website

1955 births
Living people
India MPs 2004–2009
India MPs 2009–2014
Janata Dal (United) politicians
Politicians from Patna
Lok Sabha members from Bihar
Rajya Sabha members from Bihar
Samata Party politicians
Candidates in the 2014 Indian general election
Candidates in the 2019 Indian general election
India MPs 2019–present
Tilka Manjhi Bhagalpur University alumni